Oscar Engsund (born August 3, 1993) is a Swedish ice hockey defenceman currently playing with Luleå HF in the Swedish Hockey League (SHL).

He made his Elitserien debut playing with HV71 during the 2012–13 Elitserien season.

References

External links

1993 births
Frölunda HC players
HV71 players
IK Oskarshamn players
Kristianstads IK players
Living people
Luleå HF players
Swedish ice hockey defencemen
Ice hockey people from Gothenburg